La revancha may refer to:

 La revancha (1989 TV series), a 1989 Venezuelan telenovela
 La revancha (2000 TV series), a 2000 Venezuelan telenovela